Ash Lake is a  lake located north of Great Central Lake and south of Elsie Lake.  Ash Lake is named after Dr. Ash one of the  sponsors of Robert Brown's Vancouver Island Exploring Expedition of 1864.

References

Alberni Valley
Lakes of Vancouver Island
Newcastle Land District